The Women's 50 metre freestyle S8 event at the 2018 Commonwealth Games was held on 10 April 2018 at the Gold Coast Aquatic Centre.

Schedule
The schedule is as follows:

All times are Australian Eastern Standard Time (UTC+10)

Results

Heats

Final

References

Women's 50 metre freestyle S8
Common